William Edward Burton (March 29, 1915 – May 13, 1984) was an American athlete. He competed in the men's discus throw at the 1948 Summer Olympics.

References

1915 births
1984 deaths
Athletes (track and field) at the 1948 Summer Olympics
American male discus throwers
Olympic track and field athletes of the United States
Place of birth missing